Sørlandet Hospital Arendal is one of the three regional hospitals in Hospital of Southern Norway (trust). The hospital is located on Kloppene in Arendal,  Aust-Agder County in Norway.

There are receipts for acute somatic disorders and surgery.

There are also maternity clinic, psychiatric inpatient treatment, substance abuse and addiction treatment,  and a clinic for mental health (psychiatry) and addiction treatment for adults. There is also a separate department for child- and adolescent psychiatry. (BUP).
.

There is an ambulance station and Arendal Heliport (Air medical services) at the hospital.

External links
Official pages 

Buildings and structures in Arendal
Hospitals in Norway